Ezzedine Khémila is a Tunisian football manager.

References

Year of birth missing (living people)
Living people
Tunisian football managers
AS Djerba managers
EO Sidi Bouzid managers
ES Métlaoui managers
EGS Gafsa managers
ES Beni-Khalled managers
US Ben Guerdane managers
Olympique Béja managers
Sfax Railways Sports managers
ES Zarzis managers